Llanwrda railway station serves the village of Llanwrda near Llandovery, Carmarthenshire.

All trains serving the station are operated by Transport for Wales.

Facilities
Like many of its neighbours, the station has only one active platform, no surviving permanent buildings and is located adjacent to an automatic half barrier level crossing. The barrier sequence is triggered by the train crew (pressing a plunger on the platform) for northbound services, so these are all timetabled to stop here. Southbound services however only call if requested to do so. The station also has the usual collection of amenities common to others on this part of the line (waiting shelter, CIS display, timetable poster board and customer help point) as well as a payphone. Level access is available between the main entrance and platform.

Services
There are four trains a day to Shrewsbury northbound from Monday to Saturday (plus a fifth to ) and five southbound to Llanelli and Swansea (the first train in each direction does not run on Saturdays); two services each way call on Sundays.

References

Further reading

External links 

Railway stations in Carmarthenshire
DfT Category F2 stations
Former Vale of Towy Railway stations
Railway stations in Great Britain opened in 1858
Heart of Wales Line
Railway stations served by Transport for Wales Rail
Railway request stops in Great Britain